Taxandria is a group of plants in the family Myrtaceae described as a genus in 2007. The entire genus is endemic to Western Australia, growing near the coast in the South West corner of the State.

Most species of Taxandria generally growing as tall shrubs, but Taxandria juniperina grows to tree size (up to 27m) and Taxandria linearifolia can grow as a small tree (up to 5m in height).

species

References

 
Rosids of Western Australia
Myrtaceae genera
Myrtales of Australia
Endemic flora of Southwest Australia